Genius Loci is a novel by Ben Aaronovitch, focusing on the early career of Bernice "Benny" Summerfield, a character from the spin-off media based on the long-running British science fiction television series Doctor Who. This was the first of Big Finish's Bernice Summerfield novels to be released under the New Worlds format.

The book is set before Benny met the Doctor and was not officially licensed by the BBC (as owners of Doctor Who), but does contain some allusions to Doctor Who, specifically the Silurians as depicted in the television series and in the Virgin New Adventures spin-off novels. The book also references Benny's back-story as explored in the New Adventures.

Plot summary
A young Bernice Summerfield lands a job as an archaeologist on a colony world. She discovers evidence that the planet was previously inhabited by a sapient species.

External links
Big Finish Productions - Bernice Summerfield: Genius Loci

2006 British novels
Bernice Summerfield novels
Big Finish New Worlds
British science fiction novels
Novels by Ben Aaronovitch